Malcolm Davies is a former Welsh professional darts player who competed in the 1980s.

Career
He competed in the 1984 BDO World Darts Championship, beating Bobby George in the first round but lost in the second round to fellow Welshman Peter Locke. He then played in the 1986 BDO World Darts Championship and succeeded in reaching the second round by defeating Australian Russell Stewart but lost to Eric Bristow. Davies reached the quarter finals of the 1986 Winmau World Masters where he lost to Canada's Bob Sinnaeve who eventually lost in the final to Bob Anderson.

World Championship results

BDO
 1984: Second round: (lost to Peter Locke 3–4)
 1986: Second round: (lost to Eric Bristow 0–3)

References

Profile and stats on Darts Database

Living people
Welsh darts players
British Darts Organisation players
Sportspeople from Cardiff
1960 births